Jan Berg (born 22 May 1985) is a Finnish retired footballer.

References
  vepsu.fi
  Veikkausliiga Hall of Fame
  veikkausliiga.com

1985 births
Living people
Finnish footballers
Finnish expatriate footballers
Vaasan Palloseura players
Kuopion Palloseura players
Veikkausliiga players
JIPPO players
Association football defenders
People from Siilinjärvi
Sportspeople from North Savo